Rodrigo Andrade da Silva (born 5 February 1988), known as Rodrigo Andrade, is a Brazilian footballer who plays as an attacking midfielder.

Career

Flamengo and America
Diguinho was revealed by the Flamengo and then loaned to America to gain experience. The club alvirrubro dispute the Campeonato Carioca Second Division player and soon received opportunities.

For show enough mobility and eye for goal, the attacking midfielder proved a highlight of the team throughout the season. Over time, Diguinho was loved by the American crowd, especially when on 31 October, the player scored the only goal from a superb free kick on 33 minutes into the second half in a match against Olaria at Estádio do Maracanã secured the leadership for the team rubra.

Botafogo
After calling attention to 14 goals during the tournament and the fine performance in winning the Campeonato Carioca Second Division, the attacking midfielder, who was ending his contract with Flamengo, eventually striking a deal with Botafogo for the 2010 season.

Loan to Atlético Goianiense
In August, he was loaned to Atlético Goianiense until the end of the Campeonato Brasileiro Série A in 2010.

Loan to Ceará
On 14 June 2011, Diguinho moved to Ceará, signing a loan deal lasting until the end of the 2011 season.

Career statistics
(Correct )

Honours
Botafogo
Campeonato Carioca: 2010

Contract
 Atlético Goianiense.

References

External links
goal 
WebSoccerClub 

1988 births
Living people
Footballers from Rio de Janeiro (city)
Brazilian footballers
Association football midfielders
Campeonato Brasileiro Série A players
Campeonato Brasileiro Série B players
Campeonato Brasileiro Série D players
CR Flamengo footballers
America Football Club (RJ) players
Botafogo de Futebol e Regatas players
Atlético Clube Goianiense players
Ceará Sporting Club players
Londrina Esporte Clube players
Esporte Clube XV de Novembro (Piracicaba) players
Associação Portuguesa de Desportos players
Figueirense FC players
Clube Atlético Bragantino players
Brasiliense Futebol Clube players
Botafogo Futebol Clube (SP) players
Criciúma Esporte Clube players
Grêmio Osasco Audax Esporte Clube players
Associação Chapecoense de Futebol players
Fortaleza Esporte Clube players
Red Bull Brasil players
Paysandu Sport Club players
Volta Redonda FC players
Associação Atlética Portuguesa (RJ) players
Sampaio Corrêa Futebol Clube players
Botafogo Futebol Clube (PB) players